McKinley Lenard Price (born March 10, 1949) is an American politician and dentist who served as the mayor of the city of Newport News, Virginia from 2010 until 2022.

Career
Price graduated from Collis P. Huntington High School in 1967 and Hampton Institute in 1971 before serving in the United States Army as a commissioned officer. He was honorably discharged as a first lieutenant in 1972. Price attended Howard University College of Dentistry, after which he performed a general anesthesia residency at Providence Hospital in Baltimore.

During the COVID-19 pandemic, Price helped by encouraging people to get vaccinated and administering vaccinations himself.

Personal life
Price is a member of Alpha Phi Alpha fraternity. Price is married to Valerie Scott Price, a retired teacher of thirty years who worked with the Newport News Public School System. Together, they have two children.

See also

Newport News, Virginia

References

African-American mayors in Virginia
American dentists
1949 births
Living people
Mayors of Newport News, Virginia
Military personnel from Virginia
United States Army officers
Virginia Independents
Hampton University alumni
Howard University alumni
21st-century American politicians
21st-century African-American politicians
20th-century African-American politicians
20th-century American politicians